The following lists the top 100 singles of 1990 in Australia from the Australian Recording Industry Association (ARIA) End of Year Singles Chart. ARIA had previously used the Kent Music Report, known from 1987 onwards as the Australian Music Report.

Peak chart positions are from the ARIA Charts, overall position on the End of Year Chart is calculated by ARIA based on the number of weeks and position that the records reach within the Top 50 singles for each week during 1990.

Notes

References

Australian record charts
1990 in Australian music
1990 record charts